Potassium voltage-gated channel subfamily A member 7 also known as Kv1.7 is a protein that in humans is encoded by the KCNA7 gene. The protein encoded by this gene is a voltage-gated potassium channel subunit. It may contribute to the cardiac transient outward potassium current (Ito1), the main contributing current to the repolarizing phase 1 of the cardiac action potential.

References

Further reading

External links 
 
 

Ion channels